Mediasia is a genus of flowering plants belonging to the family Apiaceae.

Its native range is Central Asia to Afghanistan.

Species
Species:
 Mediasia macrophylla (Regel & Schmalh.) Pimenov

References

Apioideae
Apioideae genera